The president of the General Conference is the head of the General Conference of Seventh-day Adventists, the governing body of the Seventh-day Adventist Church. The president's office is within the offices of the General Conference, located in Silver Spring, Maryland. As of June 2010, the current president is Ted N. C. Wilson.

Traditionally, the post has been held by an American. Of the 17 presidents, 13 were born in the United States, 1 born in Puerto Rico to North American missionaries, 1 born in Australia and 2 born in Norway, of whom one emigrated to the U.S. at age 5.

Presidents of the General Conference of Seventh-day Adventists

See also

 General Conference of Seventh-day Adventists
 Seventh-day Adventist Church

References

Seventh-day Adventists
 
Seventh-day Adventist Church-related lists
General Conference of Seventh-day Adventists